Lisa Moore may refer to:

 Lisa Moore (musician) (born 1960), Australian classical musician
 Lisa Moore (writer) (born 1964), Canadian writer
 Lisa L. Moore, American academic
 Lisa Bronwyn Moore, Canadian actress
 Lisa Jean Moore (born 1967), professor of sociology and gender studies
 Lisa Schulte Moore, American landscape ecologist
 Lisa Moore (figure skater), American pairs figure skater, see 2006 United States Figure Skating Championships
 Lisa Moore, a character in the American comic strip Funky Winkerbean